Sultan Agung Stadium is a multi-use stadium in Bantul, Indonesia.  It is currently used mostly for football matches and is used as the home venue for Persiba Bantul of the Liga Indonesia. The stadium has a capacity of 35,000. The stadium was built in 2004. It first started hosting matches from Liga Indonesia in 2005.

The stadium was inaugurated by the Governor of Yogyakarta Sri Sultan Hamengkubuwono X at the opening ceremony coincided PORDA Bantul DIY-IX on June 24, 2007. Though inaugurated in 2007, this stadium has been used to stage local soccer matches and Liga Indonesia since 2005.

References

External links
 Stadium photo from worldstadiums.com

Persiba Bantul
Sports venues in Special Region of Yogyakarta
Multi-purpose stadiums in Special Region of Yogyakarta
Football venues in Special Region of Yogyakarta
Athletics (track and field) venues in Special Region of Yogyakarta
Buildings and structures in the Special Region of Yogyakarta
Sports venues completed in 2007